Seble Tefera (24 August 1976 – 12 September 2015) was an Ethiopian actress and comedian best known for her acting in various comedy films. She has been acting in the role of "Terfe" in a 2013 sitcom Betoch until her death.

Life and career
Seble Tefera was born on 24 August 1976 in Addis Ababa, Ethiopia. She completed high school at Nefas Silk Comprehensive Secondary High School and attended Addis Ababa University in department of Theatrical Arts.

Seble notably played as "Emama Chebe" in a radio program called Tininish Tsehayoch that broadcast in Fana Broadcasting Corporate from 2009 to 2014. She was known for role in various comedy films, notably in Yarefede Arada (2014), co-starring with Shewaferaw Desalegn.

In 2013, she was widely gained prominence for playing as "Terfe" in a 2013 sitcom Betoch as housemaid.

Personal life and death
Seble was married to Moges Tesfaye, but had no children.

On 12 September 2015, Seble was killed by car crash while she was travelling to Bahir Dar with her husband in the Ethiopian New Year. According to her husband, the car accident was caused by a distraction from increasing radio volume while driving and collapsed into stationed truck in area commonly called Saris. Seble was dead on arrival at a hospital hours later, and her burial took place at the Holy Trinity Cathedral with notable people and her relatives present.

Filmography

References

External links
 Seble Tefera at Yageru

1976 births
2015 deaths
Ethiopian actresses
21st-century Ethiopian actresses
Ethiopian film actresses
Road incident deaths in Ethiopia
People from Addis Ababa